The 2015–16 season was Swindon Town's 137th season in their existence and their fourth consecutive season in League One. Along with competing in League One, the club also participated in the FA Cup, League Cup and Football League Trophy. The season covered the period from 1 July 2015 to 30 June 2016.

Season events

Pre-season

June
  – The exits of Harry Agombar, Josue Antonio, George Barker, Jack Barthram, Matty Jones, Cameron Belford, Wes Foderingham, Darren Ward, Connor Waldon and Andy Williams were confirmed.
  – The club signed a formal agreement with Calne Town Council to use the Beversbrook Sports Facility for training while the club sought a site closer to Swindon.

July
  – Anton Rodgers signed a new two-year deal with the club.
  – Former Liverpool defender Brandon Ormonde-Ottewill signed a two-year deal.
  – Liverpool defender Kevin Stewart signed a season-long loan deal.
  – The club were charged by the Football Association over the signing of Redditch United forward Jermaine Hylton.
  – Drissa Traoré signed a one-year contract with the club.
  – Reported interest for Bournemouth for Will Randall was rebuffed.
  – Fabien Robert signed a one-year contract with the club.

August
  – Southampton defender Jordan Turnbull returned to the club by signing a season-long loan deal.
  – Former Maidstone United midfielder Ellis Iandolo signed a professional deal.
  – Town owner Lee Power announced that a price has been agreed on land within the borough for a multi-million-pound training facility for the club.
  – Lawrence Vigouroux became the third Liverpool player to sign a season-long loan deal.
  – Non-League defender James Brophy signed a one-year contract after a successful trial period.
  – Former Brighton & Hove Albion and cousin of former England midfielder Gareth Barry, Bradley Barry, signed a one-year contract after a successful trial period.
  – Youth team graduate Josh Cooke joined Cheltenham Town on loan until January 2016.
  – Swindon were eliminated from the League Cup first round, losing 2–1 to League side Exeter City.
  – Town signed Jordan Stewart from Northern Ireland side Glentoran.

September
  – Nathan Byrne left to join Wolverhampton Wanderers for an undisclosed fee.
  – Inverness Caledonian Thistle signed Town forward Miles Storey on loan.
  – Wes Thomas joined the club from Birmingham City on loan until January 2016.
  – Former Town loan player Nicky Ajose rejoined the club on a permanent basis after his contract with Leeds United was terminated.
  – Swindon Town recruit Frenchman Jeremy Balmy and Estonia international Henrik Ojamaa until the end of the season.
  – Louis Thompson rejoined the club on a youth loan from Norwich City.
  – Lawrence Vigouroux was recalled by Liverpool due to a disciplinary matter.
  – Lawrence Vigouroux resumed his loan spell at Swindon.

October
  – Momar Bangoura signed a short-term contract with the club.
  – The club parted company with manager, Mark Cooper.

November
  – Former player Martin Ling was appointed manager of Swindon Town.
  – Ross Embleton joined the backroom staff as First Team Coach.
  – Centre-forward Jamie Calvin signed a one-year contract.

December
  – Momar Bangoura was released upon the completion of his short-term contract.
  – Martin Ling resigned as manager of Swindon Town citing health reasons.

January
  – Loan players Louis Thompson, Ben Gladwin, Adam El-Abd and Wes Thomas were all recalled by their parent clubs.
  – Henrik Ojamaa left the club by mutual consent.
  – Liverpool manager Jürgen Klopp recalled Kevin Stewart from his season-long loan deal at the club.
  – Swindon Town youth graduate Will Randall joined Wolverhampton Wanderers for an undisclosed fee.
  – Michael Doughty signed on a one-month loan deal from Queens Park Rangers.
  – Luke Williams was confirmed as Swindon Town manager until the end of the season.

February
  – Jamie Sendles-White signed a permanent deal until the end of the season.

March
  – Luke Williams signed a 5-year contract extension.

April
  – The club suspended Drissa Traore, Brandon Ormonde-Ottewill and Jeremy Balmy and investigate reports that they inhaled nitrous oxide on the live social media app, Periscope.
  – Norwich City goalkeeper Jake Kean joined on an emergency loan deal.

First Team

NOTE: Players in italics departed the club permanently before the end of the 2015–16 season.

Transfers

In

Total spending:  £50,000

Out

Loans in

Loans out

Squad statistics

Appearances, goals and cards

|-
|colspan="14"|Players who are contracted to Swindon Town but are currently out on loan:

|-
|colspan="14"|Players who were contracted to Swindon Town but have since departed on a permanent basis:

|-
|}

Goal scorers

Clean sheets

Disciplinary record

Suspensions served

Competitions

Summary

Score overview

Results by round

League One

League table

Matches

Pre-season friendlies
On 29 May 2015, Swindon Town announced they would host FA Cup finalists Aston Villa on 21 July 2015. On 23 June 2015, Swindon added Swindon Supermarine to the pre-season schedule. A visit from Premier League side Everton on 11 July 2015, was confirmed on 29 June 2015. A friendly against Southern League Central side Petersfield Town was later announced for July 18. On 7 July 2015, Swindon Town added a home friendly against West Bromwich Albion. On 13 July 2015, Swindon Town announced a sixth and seventh friendly against Solihull Moors and Liverpool respectively. A behind-closed-doors friendly versus Queens Park Rangers was also arranged.

League One

On 17 June 2015, the fixtures for the forthcoming season were announced.

F.A. Cup

League Cup
On 16 June 2015, the first round draw was made, Swindon Town were drawn at home against Exeter City.

Football League Trophy
On 8 August 2015, live on Soccer AM the draw for the first round of the Football League Trophy was drawn by Toni Duggan and Alex Scott. Robins were to travel to Newport County. On 5 September 2015, the second round draw was shown live on Soccer AM and drawn by Charlie Austin and Ed Skrein. Swindon were drawn away to Oxford United.

References

External links
 Swindon Town F.C.
 Total Sport
 BBC Sport
 Sky Sports
 Soccerbase

Swindon Town
Swindon Town F.C. seasons